Warri South is a Local Government Area of Delta State, Nigeria. Its headquarters is in the city of Warri.

It has an important sea port in the country and is the commercial nerve centre of the state, With Dr. Tidi Michael as the current local government chairman. The area is predominantly riverine with large expanses of mangrove forests and has a land. It harbors many industrial establishments including all the major oil companies operating in Nigeria.

It is home to the itsekeri, Urhobo, and Ijaw people.

Governance
Warri South local government like every other local government area in Nigeria runs two arms of government as enshrined in the 1999 constitution. The two arms are the executive and the legislature. The executive is made up of the chairman, the deputy chairman, supervisors and secretary to the local government. The legislature is made up of the speaker, deputy speaker, majority and minority leaders.
The table below provides the list of Chairmen that has administered Warri South Local Government from the time it was created.

Social Infrastructure
Warri South local government area has lots of schools (public and private), health facilities, means of transport, tourism and recreational facilities.

Education
There are over 100 schools in Warri South Local Government with these evenly spread between public and private. The College of Education Warri is located at Edjeba, Warri. 
Popular schools in Warri includes the following. 
 1. Dom Dom Mingos 
 2. Hussey College
 3. Nanna College
 4. Dore Numa
 5. Uwangue College

Health Facilities
Several hospitals and other health facilities are based in Warri. The main hospital in Warri is the General Hospital Warri, which caters for all the people who mainly can't afford the cost of private care. Each area has a health centre which serves as the place for primary care for most people. There are also lots of clinics, chemists, pharmacies, etc.
Other popular hospitals in Warri
 1. Lily Hospital
 2. Westend Hospital
 3. Capital Hill
 4. The Sage Clinic

References

See also
Warri

Local Government Areas in Delta State
Populated coastal places in Nigeria